David Generelo Miranda (born 11 August 1982) is a Spanish retired footballer who played as a central midfielder, and an assistant manager.

He amassed La Liga totals of 100 games and six goals, representing in the competition Zaragoza, Gimnàstic and Elche (only one game with the latter club). He added 145 matches and 9 goals in Segunda División, during a 16-year professional career.

Club career
Born in Badajoz, Extremadura, Generelo emerged through local CD Badajoz's youth academy, signing with Real Zaragoza in January 2000 and being assigned to the reserves in the third division. He first appeared with the first team during 2002–03's second level and, from then on, would be regularly used by the Aragonese although never an undisputed starter, helping the club win the Copa del Rey in his first professional season.

In 2006–07, Generelo served a loan spell at newly promoted Gimnàstic de Tarragona, appearing regularly as the Catalans were immediately relegated from La Liga. The following campaign was curtailed after just four games, due to a serious foot injury.

After contributing with 23 matches – mainly from the bench – as Zaragoza returned to the top flight after one year out, Generelo's contract with the club expired. On 22 July 2009, he joined Elche CF in a 2+1 deal.

Generelo subsequently represented RCD Mallorca and Real Oviedo, achieving promotion to division two with the latter. He retired on 15 December at the age of 33, after suffering a knee injury.

On 17 March 2016, Generelo was appointed interim manager of his last club Oviedo after Sergio Egea's resignation. After working with Zaragoza's youth academy, he rejoined former Elche boss Fran Escribá's coaching staff at RC Celta de Vigo in March 2019.

Managerial statistics

Honours
Zaragoza
Copa del Rey: 2003–04
Supercopa de España: 2004

Elche
Segunda División: 2012–13

Oviedo
Segunda División B: 2014–15

References

External links

1982 births
Living people
Sportspeople from Badajoz
Spanish footballers
Footballers from Extremadura
Association football midfielders
La Liga players
Segunda División players
Segunda División B players
CD Badajoz players
Real Zaragoza B players
Real Zaragoza players
Gimnàstic de Tarragona footballers
Elche CF players
RCD Mallorca players
Real Oviedo players
Spanish football managers
Segunda División managers
Real Oviedo managers
Elche CF non-playing staff